The 2005–06 SEB Korvpalli Meistriliiga was the 15th season of the Estonian basketball league and the second under the title sponsorship of SEB. Including the competition's previous incarnations, this was the 81st season of the Estonian men's basketball league.

The season started on 5 October 2005 and concluded on 30 May 2006 with Kalev/Cramo defeating TÜ/Rock 4 games to 3 in the 2006 KML Finals to win their 2nd Estonian League title.

Regular season

League table

Playoffs

Bracket

Awards

MVP
  Tanel Tein (TÜ/Rock)

Finals MVP
  James Williams (Kalev/Cramo)

Best Young Player
  Sten Sokk (Noortekoondis/Audentes)

Coach of the Year
  Aivar Kuusmaa (Kalev/Cramo)

All-KML team

References

External links
 Official website

Korvpalli Meistriliiga seasons
Estonian
KML